Giorgio Sterchele (born 8 January 1970 in Schio) is an Italian former footballer who played as a goalkeeper.

Career
In his early years, Sterchele played with Vicenza Calcio, the team of his province. He played regularly for the club as of 1991 and won Serie A promotion with the team in 1995. He achieved two promotions and in 1995 he moved on to A.S. Roma. He also played for Cagliari (January 1997), Bologna, Ternana (January 1999) and Perugia Calcio (January 2000), before returning to Vicenza in 2000.

With 285 appearances for Vicenza, he has currently played more matches than any other goalkeeper in Vicenza's history. Only three players in the history of Vicenza have played in more games than Sterchele.

External links
 2006–07 Profile at La Gazzetta

1970 births
Living people
Italian footballers
People from Schio
L.R. Vicenza players
A.S. Roma players
Cagliari Calcio players
Bologna F.C. 1909 players
A.C. Perugia Calcio players
Association football goalkeepers
Serie A players
Serie B players